Armor On is the first EP and second major release by American recording artist Dawn Richard as a solo act. Dawn Richard is best known for being a part of Diddy – Dirty Money and Danity Kane. The album and track listing for Armor On was revealed on March 7, 2012. The album serves as a prelude to her upcoming album Goldenheart Trilogy, the first of which was released in January 2013. Armor On was released exclusively on iTunes.

Richard released several promotional songs before the release of the album. "S.M.F.U (Save Me from You)" was the first. A black-and-white video for "S.M.F.U" was released online. "Change" was released as the second promotional single from Armor On, while "Black Lipstick" was chosen as the third promotional single.

The lead single "Bombs" debuted March 27 and Richard appeared on 106 & Park to premiere the video. On June 25, the video for the second single "Automatic" premiered on 106 & Park.

Background
Dawn said that the split was amicable. Following the disbanding of Dirty Money, Diddy told her that she would have to wait a year or two to release a solo project if she stuck around, but after requesting a release, he granted it. "It was a choice and I needed to go where the best place was for me," said Dawn. "As an artist, you can't wait two years. People forget about you in three seconds, so you have to grind like no other to stay relevant. He was gracious enough to say, 'I'll let you do that.' Labels don't do that. They'll shelve you. [...] I was so thankful that he didn't do what everybody said he was gonna do. He was like, 'You gave me six years, so here's your chance.'"

In an interview Richard said "You're gonna hear R&B taken to a whole 'nother level." She worked with Druski on nine of the EP's 10 tracks. The EP serves as a prelude to her album Goldenheart. Richard released several songs before the anticipated release date ("Change", "Black Lipstick", "Fly", and the bass-driven "Bombs") though "Fly" is not on the final track listing. This EP serves as an opening to the sound of Goldenheart. Dawn Richard presented Armor On at a listening session in Beverly Hills on March 21, 2012. In an interview Richard spoke on her feelings about Armor On, saying "We are pushing the limits. [...] R&B is really linear and it's not a bad thing. I just think being with Danity Kane and being with Dirty Money, I've experienced so many things sonically and lyrically that I want ya'll to be moved. It's time for something a little bit more refreshing. I want to be that person for you guys."

Reception

Critical response

Armor On received considerable acclaim from critics.

Track listing

Notes:
 "Wild 'N' Young" is not featured for purchase in the iTunes Store. A video for this song was released in August 2012, but under the name Wild 'N' Faith.

Personnel

Musicians
 Dawn Richard – vocals

Productions
 Druski – producer
 Ricky "Ric Rude" Lewis – producer
 Carla Carter – songwriter
 Stan Greene – engineer

Staff
 Kyle Cabrol – Executive Assistant

Charts

Release history

References

2012 EPs
Dawn Richard (singer) EPs